Brînza is a village in Cahul District, Moldova. Brînza village was established in 1630.

References

Villages of Cahul District
Populated places on the Prut